Newton for Hyde railway station, serves the Newton area of Hyde in Greater Manchester, England. The station unusually features both a covered subway underneath the platforms and a larger viaduct tunnel accessible from both sides, meaning there are 2 ways to cross platforms underground. The eastern side of the station containing these passageways is raised on the viaduct.

History
The station was opened by the Sheffield, Ashton-Under-Lyne and Manchester Railway as "Newton and Hyde" in 1841, however the station signage referred to the station as "Newton". Trains originally ran from Manchester to Sheffield on the Woodhead Line, with a rail yard immediately to the south bounded by Sheffield Road, the remains of a covered shed being visible on the Westbound platform. The line was electrified in 1953 and closed to passengers between Hadfield and Penistone in 1970. Following the privatisation of train services in 1997, the route was operated by First North Western until 2004 and then Northern Rail, whose franchise was extended until February 2016. Services were taken over by and ran Northern from April 2016 to February 2020. Services are now run by Northern Trains who took over running services in March 2020. The official name on tickets is "Newton for Hyde" to avoid confusion with Newton (South Lanarkshire) and from July 2007 new signage was installed with the legend 'Newton For Hyde'.

Facilities
The station has a main building and staffed ticket office at street level - this is staffed six days per week on a part-time basis (morning and early afternoons only, like several others on the route such as ).  Waiting shelters, CIS displays, timetable information posters and bench seating are provided at platform level.  The subway linking the platforms and ticket hall has steps, but level access is possible to the eastbound platform only via Danby Road.

Services

There is generally a half-hourly daily service Monday to Sunday daytimes to Manchester Piccadilly westbound and Hadfield eastbound with additional weekday peak extras and an hourly evening service in each direction. Early morning, late evening and rush hour services start or terminate at Glossop.

A half-hourly service operates on Sundays.

Buses do not run directly to or from the station, but the 346 bus (from Ashton-Under-Lyne to Hyde) runs 100m north-east of the westbound platforms.

Gallery

References

External links

Railway stations in Tameside
DfT Category E stations
Former Great Central Railway stations
Railway stations in Great Britain opened in 1841
Northern franchise railway stations
Hyde, Greater Manchester